"I Do" is the second single from Gin Wigmore's first studio album, Holy Smoke.

Music video
The music video for "I Do" begins by showing Gin playing a ukulele on rocks near the sea, standing under an archway reading "Holy Smoke", which is the name of the album the single is from. She sees movement in the water, and proceeds to step down the rocks toward the sea. The movement in the water is shown to have come from a merman. The merman is smoking a pipe, then drinks some tea. This is a reference to the 1999 Rugrats episode "I Do".

Charts

Certifications

References

2009 singles
Gin Wigmore songs
2009 songs
Songs written by Martin Terefe
Songs written by Sacha Skarbek